Gazole Assembly constituency is an assembly constituency in Malda district in the Indian state of West Bengal. It is reserved for scheduled castes.

Overview
As per orders of the Delimitation Commission, No. 44 Gazole Assembly constituency (SC) covers Gazole community development block.

Gazole Assembly constituency is part of No. 7 Maldaha Uttar (Lok Sabha constituency).

Members of Legislative Assembly

Election results

2016
In the 2016 election, Dipali Biswas of CPI(M) defeated his nearest rival Sushil Chandra Roy of Trinamool Congress.

Note- In 2016 election, the Indian National Congress supported CPIM in this seat.

2011
In the 2011 election, Sushil Chandra Roy of Congress defeated his nearest rival Gobinda Mondal of CPI(M).

.# Swing based on Congress+Trinamool Congress vote percentages taken together in 2006.

1977-2006
In the 2006 and 2001 state assembly elections Sadhu Tudu of CPI(M) won the Gazole (ST) assembly seat defeating his nearest rivals Jatin Hansda of Congress and Nabakumar Hembrom of Trinamool Congress respectively. Contests in most years were multi cornered but only winners and runners are being mentioned. Debnath Murmu of CPI(M) defeated Benjamin Hembrom of Congress in 1996 and Nabakumar Hembram of Congress in 1991. Suphal Murmu of CPI(M) defeated Nabakumar Hembram of Congress in 1987, Benjamin Hembram of Congress in 1982, and Shyan Murmu of Janata Party in 1977.

1951–1972
Benjamin Hembram of Congress won in 1972. Suphal Murmu of CPI(M) won in 1971. Lakshan Saren of Congress won in 1969. D. Murmu of Congress won in 1967. The Gazole seat did not exist in 1962 and 1957. In independent India's first election in 1951 Dharanidhar Sarkar of CPI won the Gazole seat.

References

Assembly constituencies of West Bengal
Politics of Malda district